Bodrogu may refer to one of two villages in Arad County, Romania:

Bodrogu Nou, a village in Zădăreni Commune
Bodrogu Vechi, a village in Pecica town